The E. P. Dodge Building is a historic building at 19-23 Pleasant Street in Newburyport, Massachusetts.  The Italianate five story brick building was built in 1873 by Elisha P. Dodge, a shoemaker, for use as a factory.  When first built it was only four stories, but when Dodge enlarged the premises in 1880, the mansard section was added on top (in addition to extending the building to the rear as far as Prince Place).  The building remained in use as a shoe factory until the 1930s, and is now used for commercial and light industrial purposes.

The building was listed on the National Register of Historic Places in 1982, and included in the Newburyport Historic District in 1984.

See also
National Register of Historic Places listings in Essex County, Massachusetts

References

Industrial buildings and structures on the National Register of Historic Places in Massachusetts
Buildings and structures in Newburyport, Massachusetts
National Register of Historic Places in Essex County, Massachusetts
Historic district contributing properties in Massachusetts